The Mpwapwa wedge-snouted worm lizard (Geocalamus modestus) is a worm lizard species in the family Amphisbaenidae. It is endemic to Tanzania.

References

Geocalamus
Reptiles described in 1880
Taxa named by Albert Günther
Endemic fauna of Tanzania
Reptiles of Tanzania